Bid Zard-e Olya (also Romanized as Bīd Zard-e ‘Olyā; also known as Bīd Zard-e Bālā) is a village in Bid Zard Rural District, in the Central District of Shiraz County, Fars Province, Iran. At the 2006 census, its population was 1,206, in 295 families.

References 

Populated places in Shiraz County